The following is a list of soundtracks from the animated web series RWBY, created by Monty Oum, which premiered on the Rooster Teeth website on July 18, 2013, and is currently ongoing. The music for RWBY has been composed primarily by Jeff Williams, with additional composition by Steve Goldshein, Mason Lieberman, and Alex Abraham. Williams was a member of the band Trocadero, who created the music for Rooster Teeth's Red vs. Blue, and would independently compose the eighth, ninth, and tenth seasons of the series. Other artists featured in the soundtracks include Williams' daughter, Casey Lee Williams, as well as Lamar Hall, Adrienne Cowan, Dawn M. Bennett, and Caleb Hyles.

Volume 1 

RWBY: Volume 1 (Music from the Rooster Teeth Series) was released on November 12, 2013. It includes the songs used in the trailers, the intro to the series' episodes, and also the score music to each episode. The soundtrack also contained previously unreleased songs such as "I May Fall" and "Wings". These songs were, however, briefly played at the end of various episodes.

Volume 1 reached number one on iTunes, beating out the movie soundtrack to The Hunger Games: Catching Fire. The soundtrack reached number 22 on Billboards Top Rock Albums charts.

Volume 2 

RWBY: Volume 2 (Music from the Rooster Teeth Series) was released on December 2, 2014.  The soundtrack reached number 6 on Billboard's Hard Rock Albums.

Volume 3 

RWBY: Volume 3 (Music from the Rooster Teeth Series) was released on May 3, 2016.  The album reached number 5 on the Billboards Hard Rock Albums chart, and number 12 on the Top Rock Albums chart.

Volume 4 

RWBY: Volume 4 (Music from the Rooster Teeth Series) was released on June 16, 2017.  The album reached number 79 on the Billboard 200. It also appeared on the magazine's other album charts, with number 5 on Independent Albums, number 6 on Hard Rock Albums, and number 18 on Top Rock Albums.

Volume 5 

RWBY: Volume 5 (Music from the Rooster Teeth Series) was released on June 8, 2018, and for Spotify on January 1, 2019. It peaked at 113th on the Billboard 200, and also peaked in the Top 20 of the Top Rock (#18) and Hard Rock (#6) charts as well, along with charting at #7 at the Independent Albums chart.

Volume 6 

RWBY: Volume 6 (Music from the Rooster Teeth Series) was released on June 28, 2019. It peaked at #7 in Billboards Independent Albums chart, #10 on Digital Albums and #11 at Soundtracks.

 Volume 7 RWBY: Volume 7 (Music from the Rooster Teeth Series) was released on July 31, 2020.

 Volume 8 RWBY: Volume 8 (Music from the Rooster Teeth Series)''''' was released on December 31, 2021. This was the first soundtrack in which Jeff Williams did not compose the score, creating only the vocal tracks. Instead, Alex Abraham was the lead composer. The release of the album was delayed due to the spread of the Delta variant in Texas, as well as a family emergency concerning Williams.

References 

2010s soundtrack albums
2020s soundtrack albums
Lists of soundtracks